The seventh season of the Pakistani music television series Coke Studio premiered on 21 September 2014 and aired its final episode on 22 November 2014. Previously, it was scheduled to premiere on 7 September 2014, but was delayed due to an ongoing political crisis which caught the media attention everywhere. Season premiered under the tagline of Sound of the Nation.

The season was produced by Strings, as the previous producer, Rohail Hyatt, had quit on 22 January 2014. while Coca-Cola returns as an executive producer. The band's members, Bilal Maqsood and Faisal Kapadia, produced the show for the first time. While they briefly appeared as featured artists in season one and season two, the duo took three months to complete the production of the series.

The season featured twenty-three artists, twenty-two musicians and twenty-eight songs. The season featured a new house band which included musicians, backing vocalists and guest musicians.

Season changes

Season 7 witnessed many changes, ranging from the production team to studio sets, from music closure to musicians and from last season's atypical music genres to the return of original music genres of show. After the quitting of Coke Studio Pakistan founder Rohail Hyatt as a producer due to the personal reasons, Strings' Bilal Maqsood and Faisal Kapadia took the charge of season, bringing back the rock, folk, pop and sufi genres of Coke Studio, with the season's Pakistani featured artists. Many artists reprised their appearances from the previous seasons. This season paid homage to the Sound of the Nation.

In a series of firsts, Season 7 delved into new unexplored genres while also touching upon the role that film music has had in defining the musical history by visiting quintessentially Pakistani film music within Coke Studio stage. With the change in appearance, Coke Studio logo's color were reverted as Coke was painted with White and Studio was Black, with the 'i' in Studio referring to Coke bottle, painted with white.

With many new additions, Coke Studio endeavored to cultivate a sense of national pride and make the platform more accessible to a diverse audience of viewers. Season 7 also featured locally and globally renowned Pakistani artists, popular Pakistani songs and performances that incorporate the use of traditional Pakistani instruments to create a tapestry of music that aptly represents the fabric of our nation.

Artists

Featured Artists 
Following is the list of twenty-four Featured Artist Line-up, that will perform as individuals, duo's and with chorus:

 Abbas Ali Khan
 Abida Parveen
 Abrar-ul-Haq
 Akhtar Chanal Zahri
 Asrar
 Fariha Pervez
 Humaira Channa
 Javed Bashir
 Jawad Ahmed
 Jimmy Khan
 Komal Rizvi
 Meesha Shafi
 Momin Durrani
 Naseer & Shahab
 Niazi Brothers
 Rachel Viccaji
 Rahat Fateh Ali Khan
 Rahma Ali
 Sajjad Ali
 Usman Riaz
 Ustad Rais Khan
 Ustad Tafu
 Zoe Viccaji
 Zohaib Hassan

Musicians 
With the departure of Hyatt, the house band was almost completely revamped with new artists. Momin Durrani and Sara Haider were the first artists who make their debut as featured artists and also served as backing singers while Rachel Viccaji returned to season 7 with her third appearance as a backing singer.

Production 
Coke Studio returned, after the sudden and abrupt ending of season six, because of copyright issues and bid the farewell to longtime producer Rohail Hyatt. After Hyattt's departure, Coca-Cola approached Strings band duo, Bilal Maqsood and Faisal Kapadia, who had appeared as featured artists in the first two seasons. Shooting of Season 7 spanned from May to July 2014, while the editing, development and progressive stages were completed in July. In an interview with Dawn, Bilal said:
  
While talking to Instep Magazine, answering to a question, Faisal said:

Coca-Cola GM Rizwan Khan said that their aim was to:
"reinvent the way music can capture the spirit of Pakistan. Coke Studio season seven will discover the talent and variance that this nation has to offer. Coke Studio has enabled and empowered Pakistani musicians to express their talents and skills. Many new stars have emerged and the initiative has provided a unique platform for the fusion and learning of music".

Episodes

Reception and review

Before the episode hitting the screens, the promos went enormously hits, as they depict the previous looks of sets, previous artists line up and studios previous music genres. Only the house band personalities were missed by audience. From the previous seasons, drummer Gumby was heavily demanded and appreciated for his work. Despite the abrupt ending of season six, people still admired Rohail and were willing to see him back.

Bilal Masood, the producer of series said:
"Taking the reigns of Pakistan's biggest music platform is a feeling that can't be expressed in words. This has been a magical ride for us, 23 artists, 22 musicians and 28 songs. As producers we couldn't have asked for more. It's all about celebrating Pakistani music and our artists".

Moreover, artists from the studio also shared their journey with Strings and their ideas of working with other producers.
Keyboard player Jaffer Zaidi said
 "I think Rohail Bhai and Strings have different strengths and weaknesses as producers, therefore the experience is entirely different. The most prominent difference this year has been the creative freedom, involvement, and dialogue being offered to all the musicians that were part of the project. God willing, season 7 has much to offer."

Bass player, Khalid Khan of Coke Studio said:
 "The best thing about this season is the fact that no one is over playing a certain instrument and everything is being used to enhance the ensemble. We have paid special attention to the groove and rest I leave it up to the listeners to decide."

See also

 Pakistan Music Stars
 Music of Pakistan

Notes and references

Notes

References

External links
 
 

Season07
2014 Pakistani television seasons
2014 Pakistani television series debuts